The Belarusian Agrarian Party is an agrarian socialist political party in Belarus. It supports the government of president Alexander Lukashenko. The leader of the party is Mikhail Rusy, who succeeded Mikhail Shimansky in 15 March 2008.

Ideology 
The party advocates the reform of society on the principles of democratic socialism, the restructuring of the economy on the basis of private and state ownership of the means of production, including land. In agriculture it recognizes the forms: production cooperative, joint-stock company, collective and state farm, peasant farm and small enterprise.

History

It was created in 1992 as the United Agrarian Democratic Party of Belarus. On 28 January 1994, it changed its name into Agrarian Party.

At the legislative election in 1995, the party obtained 33 out of 198 seats.

The 1996 constitutional crisis split the party into those who supported Lukashenko and those who, together with Syamyon Sharetski (the first party chairman), remained in the Supreme Soviet.

Syamyon Sharetski did not recognize the results of the 1996 constitutional referendum and did not submit to the decision to dissolve the Supreme Soviet. In July 1999, as the head of the legitimate legislative body recognized by the West, Syamyon Sharetski was adopted in Lithuania, where he stayed for two years. In July 2001, Syamyon Sharetski left for the United States and ceased his political activities.

On September 22, 1999, the party was re-registered.

The IV Party Congress at the end of March 2000 announced its intention to cooperate with the authorities and elected Mikhail Shimansky as its chairman.

On June 12, 2009, the Ministry of Justice of Belarus issued a written warning in connection with the fact that the party did not submit information about its activities to the Ministry.

In 2000 and 2004 it only gained 5 and 3 seats in the House of Representatives, respectively.
In 2008, the party was reduced to one seat. In the 2016 election, the party lost its remaining seat. It regained a seat in the assembly in the 2019 Belarusian parliamentary election.

Electoral performance

Presidential elections

Legislative elections

See also
Agrarian Party of Russia
Agrarian Party of Ukraine

References

1992 establishments in Belarus
Agrarian parties
Eurosceptic parties
Political parties established in 1992
Political parties in Belarus
Socialist parties in Belarus